The Extremaduran Football Federation (FEXF) is the football association responsible for all competitions of any form of football developed in Extremadura. It is integrated into the Royal Spanish Football Federation and its headquarters are located in Badajoz.

Competitions
 Men's
 Tercera División (Group 14)
 Regional Preferente (3 groups)
 Primera Regional (3 groups)
 Segunda Regional (4 groups)
 Youth
 Liga Nacional Juvenil Group XI
 Divisiones Regionales
 Women's
 Divisiones Regionales

See also 
List of Spanish regional football federations

References

External links 
  

Spanish football associations
Football in Extremadura
Sports organizations established in 1924
1924 establishments in Spain